In Greek mythology, Opheltes  (Ancient Greek: Ὀφέλτης) may refer to several figures in Greek mythology, including:
 Opheltes, the infant son of Lycurgus of Nemea, killed by a serpent.
 Opheltes, one of the Tyrrhenian pirates who attempted to deceive and kidnap Dionysus, and were changed by the god into fish or dolphins.
 Opheltes, the son of Peneleos, who died in the Trojan War. He was the father of Damasichthon, a king of Thebes.
 Opheltes, an experienced Trojan warrior. He was the father of Euryalus who accompanied Aeneas to Italy.
 Opheltes, a Dolionian killed by Telamon in the battle between the Dolionians and the Argonauts.
 Opheltes, son of Arestor, a soldier in the army of Dionysus during the Indian campaign, killed by Deriades.

Notes

References
 Hyginus, Gaius Julius, Fabulae in Apollodorus' Library and Hyginus' Fabulae: Two Handbooks of Greek Mythology, Translated, with Introductions by R. Scott Smith and Stephen M. Trzaskoma, Hackett Publishing Company,  2007. .
 Nonnus, Dionysiaca; translated by Rouse, W H D, II Books XVI–XXXV. Loeb Classical Library No. 345, Cambridge, Massachusetts, Harvard University Press; London, William Heinemann Ltd. 1940. Internet Archive.
 Nonnus, Dionysiaca; translated by Rouse, W H D, III Books XXXVI–XLVIII. Loeb Classical Library No. 346, Cambridge, Massachusetts, Harvard University Press; London, William Heinemann Ltd. 1940. Internet Archive.
 Ovid, Metamorphoses, Brookes More, Boston, Cornhill Publishing Co. 1922. Online version at the Perseus Digital Library.
 Parada, Carlos, Genealogical Guide to Greek Mythology, Jonsered, Paul Åströms Förlag, 1993. .
 Pausanias, Pausanias Description of Greece with an English Translation by W.H.S. Jones, Litt.D., and H.A. Ormerod, M.A., in 4 Volumes. Cambridge, Massachusetts, Harvard University Press; London, William Heinemann Ltd. 1918. Online version at the Perseus Digital Library.
 Smith, William, Dictionary of Greek and Roman Biography and Mythology, London (1873). Online version at the Perseus Digital Library.
 Valerius Flaccus, Gaius, Argonautica, translated by J. H. Mozley, Loeb Classical Library No. 286. Cambridge, Massachusetts, Harvard University Press; London, William Heinemann Ltd. 1928. Online version at Harvard University Press.
 Virgil, Aeneid  [books 7–12], in Aeneid: Books 7-12. Appendix Vergiliana, translated by H. Rushton Fairclough, revised by G. P. Goold, Loeb Classical Library No. 64, Cambridge, Massachusetts, Harvard University Press, 2000. Online version at Harvard University Press. .

Characters in Greek mythology
Metamorphoses into animals in Greek mythology
Dionysus in mythology